The following outline is provided as an overview of and topical guide to West Bengal:

West Bengal – state in eastern India and is the nation's fourth-most populous state, with over 91 million inhabitants. The state capital is Kolkata (Calcutta), one of the largest cities in India. Together with the neighbouring nation of Bangladesh, it makes up the ethno-linguistic region of Bengal.

General reference

Names 
 Common name: West Bengal
 Pronunciation:
 Local name: Paschim Bongo 
 Abbreviations and name codes
 ISO 3166-2 code:  IN-WB 
 Vehicle registration code: WB
 Nicknames
 Bengal
 Adjectivals 
 West Bengal
 Bengali

Rankings (amongst India's states) 

 by population: 4th
 by area (2011 census): 14th
 by crime rate (2015): 17th
 by gross domestic product (GDP) (2014): 4th
by Human Development Index (HDI): 11th
by life expectancy at birth: 
by literacy rate (2011):76.62%

Geography of West Bengal 

Geography of West Bengal
 West Bengal is: an Indian state
 Population of West Bengal: 
 Area of West Bengal:  88,750 sq km
 Atlas of West Bengal

Location of West Bengal 
 West Bengal is situated within the following regions:
 Northern Hemisphere
 Eastern Hemisphere
 Eurasia
 Asia
 South Asia
 India
 East India
 Time zone:  Indian Standard Time (UTC+05:30)

Environment of West Bengal 

 Climate of West Bengal
 Protected areas of West Bengal
 Wildlife of West Bengal

Natural geographic features of West Bengal 

 Rivers of West Bengal

Regions of West Bengal

Ecoregions of West Bengal

Administrative divisions of West Bengal

Capital of West Bengal

Kolkata

Divisions of West Bengal 

 Jalpaiguri division
 Burdwan division
 Presidency division
 Malda division
 Medinipur division

Districts of West Bengal 

Districts of West Bengal
Alipurduar district
Bankura 
purba Bardhaman
Paschim Bardhaman
Birbhum
Cooch Behar
Darjeeling
kalimpong
East Midnapore
Hooghly
Howrah
Jalpaiguri
Kolkata
Malda
Murshidabad
Nadia
North 24 Parganas  (Largest in terms of population and population density) 
Uttar Dinajpur
Purulia
South 24 Parganas  (Largest in terms of area) 
Dakshin Dinajpur
Jhargram
West Midnapore

Cities of West Bengal 

Municipal Corporations of West Bengal
Municipalities of West Bengal
Cities of West Bengal

Demography of West Bengal 

Demographics of West Bengal

Government and politics of West Bengal 

Politics of West Bengal

 Form of government: Indian state government (parliamentary system of representative democracy)
 Capital of West Bengal: Capital of West Bengal
 Elections in West Bengal
 (specific elections)

Union government in West Bengal 
 Rajya Sabha members from West Bengal

 Indian general election, 2009 (West Bengal)
 Indian general election, 2014 (West Bengal)
 2019 Indian general election in West Bengal

Branches of the government of West Bengal 

Government of West Bengal

Executive branch of the government of West Bengal 

 Head of state: Governor of West Bengal
 Head of government: Chief Minister of West Bengal
 Council of Ministers of West Bengal

Legislative branch of the government of West Bengal 

West Bengal Legislative Assembly
 Constituencies of West Bengal Legislative Assembly

Judicial branch of the government of West Bengal

Law and order in West Bengal 

 Law enforcement in West Bengal
 West Bengal Police

History of West Bengal 

History of West Bengal

History of West Bengal, by period

Prehistoric West Bengal

Ancient West Bengal

Medieval West Bengal

Colonial West Bengal

Contemporary West Bengal

History of West Bengal, by region

History of West Bengal, by subject

Culture of West Bengal 

Culture of West Bengal
 Architecture of West Bengal
 Cuisine of West Bengal
 Languages of West Bengal
 Monuments in West Bengal
 Monuments of National Importance in West Bengal
 State Protected Monuments in West Bengal
 World Heritage Sites in West Bengal

Art in West Bengal 
 Cinema of West Bengal
 Music of West Bengal

People of West Bengal 

 People from West Bengal

Religion in West Bengal 

Religion in West Bengal
 Islam in West Bengal
 Bengali Hindus

Sports in West Bengal 

Sports in West Bengal
 Cricket in West Bengal
 West Bengal Cricket Association
 Football in West Bengal
 West Bengal football team

Symbols of West Bengal 

Symbols of West Bengal
 State animal: Fishing cat
 State bird: White-throated kingfisher 
 State flower: Night-flowering jasmine
 State seal: Seal of West Bengal
 State tree: Devil tree
 Union Day: August 18  ( Day of accession to India )

Economy and infrastructure of West Bengal 

Economy of West Bengal
 Tourism in West Bengal
 Transport in West Bengal
 Airports in West Bengal

Education in West Bengal 

Education in West Bengal
 Institutions of higher education in West Bengal

Health in West Bengal 

Health in West Bengal

See also 

 Outline of India

Notes

References

External links 

 Official West Bengal Government Web Portal
 Department of Tourism, Government of West Bengal
 Directorate of Commercial Taxes, Government of West Bengal
 West Bengal Information Commission
 West Bengal Encyclopædia Britannica entry
 

West Bengal
West Bengal
 1